John Tracy (1722–1793) was the 7th Viscount of Rathcoole, baron and the Warden of All Souls College, Oxford.

Title
Viscount Tracy is the title given to Rathcoole in the County of Dublin, a title in the Peerage of Ireland. He was also titled the Right Honourable and Reverend. He succeeded Thomas Charles Tracy, 6th Viscount Tracy in 1792 and on his death in 1793 was followed by his brother Henry Leigh Tracy, 8th Viscount Tracy.

Education
He was educated at John Roysse's Free School in Abingdon. (now Abingdon School) from 1732-1741.

He was a Doctor of Divinity.

Career
Tracy was Viscount of Rathcoole and became Warden of All Souls College, Oxford in 1766.

He was a Steward of the Old Abingdonian Club in 1745.

See also
 List of Old Abingdonians

References

1722 births
1793 deaths
People educated at Abingdon School
Wardens of All Souls College, Oxford